St Leonard's Priory, Stamford was a priory in Lincolnshire, England. It was built in Stamford, supposedly on the site of a monastery which was founded by St Wilfrid in 658 and destroyed in the Danish invasion.

It was jointly refounded by William the Conqueror and William de St-Calais, the Bishop of Durham, in c1082 and remained a cell of Durham until its dissolution in 1538.

Part of the fine transitional west front and north arcade of the church survive. The ruins and site of St Leonard's Priory is a Scheduled Monument and the structure is a Grade I listed building.

See also
Greyfriars, Stamford

References

External links

Stamford Civic Society's description.  See also their interpretation board.

Further reading

Monasteries in Lincolnshire
Buildings and structures in Stamford, Lincolnshire
Benedictine monasteries in England
Christian monasteries established in the 7th century
Anglo-Saxon monastic houses
650s establishments
7th-century establishments in England
1082 establishments in England
Christian monasteries established in the 11th century
1538 disestablishments in England
Monasteries dissolved under the English Reformation
Grade I listed buildings in Lincolnshire
7th-century church buildings in England